Jameson may refer to:

Jameson (name)

Places 
In the United States
 Jameson, Missouri
 Jameson, Washington

Elsewhere
 Jameson Islands, Nunavut, Canada
 Jameson Land, Greenland
 Jameson Point, South Shetland Islands, Antarctica

Other 

 Jameson Irish Whiskey, a brand of whiskey
 Jameson Raid, a failed raid against the South African Republic
 Jameson Raid (band), British heavy metal band

See also
 Jamison (disambiguation)
 Jamieson (disambiguation)